Estakhr-e Posht (also Romanized as Estakhr-e Posht; also known as Esţalkh Posht) is a village in Estakhr-e Posht Rural District, Hezarjarib District, Neka County, Mazandaran Province, Iran. At the 2006 census, its population was 529, in 134 families.

References 

Populated places in Neka County